Hans Palmquist (born 26 December 1967) is a retired Swedish football defender.

He played for IFK Göteborg and BK Häcken before joining Norwegian team Moss FK ahead of the 1997 season. The team won promotion, and Palmquist played on the top Norwegian tier in 1998, 1999 and 2000. In 2001 and 2002 he was injured in the knee and did not play.

References

1967 births
Living people
Swedish footballers
IFK Göteborg players
BK Häcken players
Moss FK players
Swedish expatriate footballers
Expatriate footballers in Norway
Swedish expatriate sportspeople in Norway
Eliteserien players
Norwegian First Division players

Association football defenders